Vorm is a surname. Notable people with the surname include:

Eddy Vorm (born 1989), Dutch footballer
Michel Vorm (born 1983), Dutch footballer